DEC Special Graphics is a 7-bit character set developed by Digital Equipment Corporation. This was used very often to draw boxes on the VT100 video terminal and the many emulators, and used by bulletin board software. The designation escape sequence  (hexadecimal ) switched the codes for lower-case ASCII letters to draw this set, and the sequence  (hexadecimal ) switched back. IBM calls it Code page 1090.

Character set

See also
DEC Multinational Character Set (MCS)
DEC National Replacement Character Set (NRCS)
DEC Technical Character Set
DEC VT100
Box-drawing character

Footnotes

References

Character sets
Digital Equipment Corporation